This list of New Zealand lightweight boxing champions is a table showing the boxers who have won the New Zealand professional lightweight championship.

The title has been administered by the New Zealand Boxing Association and New Zealand Professional Boxing Association since 1885.

A champion will often voluntarily relinquish the title in order to fight for a higher-ranked championship, such as the world. Where the date on which a champion relinquished the title is unclear.

See also
List of New Zealand female boxing champions
List of New Zealand heavyweight boxing champions
List of New Zealand cruiserweight boxing champions
List of New Zealand light heavyweight boxing champions
List of New Zealand super middleweight boxing champions
List of New Zealand middleweight boxing champions
List of New Zealand super welterweight boxing champions
List of New Zealand welterweight boxing champions
List of New Zealand super lightweight boxing champions
List of New Zealand super featherweight boxing champions
List of New Zealand featherweight boxing champions
List of New Zealand bantamweight boxing champions
Professional boxing in New Zealand

References

External links
Boxrec
BOxing NZ History

Light